The Japan national Baseball5 team represents Japan in international Baseball5 competitions.

History
In January 2019, the Baseball Federation of Japan held a baseball5 seminar in Tokyo, with the goal of promoting the sport in Japan, specially among the kids, youth and high school and university students.

Japan participated in the inaugural Baseball5 Asia Cup in Kuala Lumpur, where the team finished second after losing to Chinese Taipei 1 match to 2.

Japan qualified for the 2022 Baseball5 World Cup, held in Mexico City. The Japanese team finished second with a 6–3 record after losing the final against Cuba 2 matches to 0.

Current roster

Staff

Tournament record

Baseball5 World Cup

Baseball5 Asia Cup

References

National baseball5 teams in Asia
Baseball5